Apple silicon is a series of system on a chip (SoC) and system in a package (SiP) processors designed by Apple Inc., mainly using the ARM architecture. It is the basis of most new Mac computers as well as iPhone, iPad, iPod Touch, Apple TV, and Apple Watch, and of products such as AirPods, HomePod, HomePod Mini, and AirTag.

Apple announced its plan to switch Mac computers from Intel processors to Apple silicon at WWDC 2020 on June 22, 2020. The first Macs built with the Apple M1 processor were unveiled on November 10, 2020. As of January 2023, all newer Mac models are built with Apple silicon; only the older model Mac Pro still uses Xeon processors.

Apple fully controls the integration of Apple silicon chips with the company's hardware and software products. Johny Srouji is in charge of Apple's silicon design. Manufacturing of the chips is outsourced to semiconductor contract manufacturers such as Samsung and TSMC.

A series 

The "A" series is a family of SoCs used in the iPhone, certain iPad models, and the Apple TV. "A" series chips were also used in the discontinued iPod Touch line and the original HomePod. They integrate one or more ARM-based processing cores (CPU), a graphics processing unit (GPU), cache memory and other electronics necessary to provide mobile computing functions within a single physical package.

Apple A4 

The Apple A4 is a PoP SoC manufactured by Samsung, the first SoC Apple designed in-house. It combines an ARM Cortex-A8 CPU also used in Samsung's S5PC110A01 SoC and a PowerVR SGX 535 graphics processor (GPU), all built on Samsung's 45-nanometer silicon chip fabrication process. The design emphasizes power efficiency. The A4 commercially debuted in 2010, in Apple's iPad tablet, and was later used in the iPhone 4 smartphone, the fourth-generation iPod Touch, and the 2nd-generation Apple TV.

The Cortex-A8 core used in the A4, dubbed "Hummingbird", is thought to use performance improvements developed by Samsung in collaboration with chip designer Intrinsity, which was subsequently acquired by Apple It can run at far higher clock rates than other Cortex-A8 designs yet remains fully compatible with the design provided by ARM. The A4 runs at different speeds in different products: 1 GHz in the first iPads, 800 MHz in the iPhone 4 and fourth-generation iPod Touch, and an undisclosed speed in the 2nd-generation Apple TV.

The A4's SGX535 GPU could theoretically push 35 million polygons per second and 500 million pixels per second, although real-world performance may be considerably less. Other performance improvements include additional L2 cache.

The A4 processor package does not contain RAM, but supports PoP installation. The 1st-generation iPad, fourth-generation iPod Touch, and the 2nd-generation Apple TV have an A4 mounted with two low-power 128 MB DDR SDRAM chips (totaling 256 MB), while the iPhone 4 has two 256 MB packages for a total of 512 MB. The RAM is connected to the processor using ARM's 64-bit-wide AMBA 3 AXI bus. To give the iPad high graphics bandwidth, the width of the RAM data bus is double that used in previous ARM11- and ARM9-based Apple devices.

Apple A5 

The Apple A5 is an SoC manufactured by Samsung that replaced the A4. The chip commercially debuted with the release of Apple's iPad 2 tablet in March 2011, followed by its release in the iPhone 4S smartphone later that year. Compared to the A4, the A5 CPU "can do twice the work" and the GPU has "up to nine times the graphics performance", according to Apple.

The A5 contains a dual-core ARM Cortex-A9 CPU with ARM's advanced SIMD extension, marketed as NEON, and a dual core PowerVR SGX543MP2 GPU. This GPU can push between 70 and 80 million polygons/second and has a pixel fill rate of 2 billion pixels/second. The iPad 2's technical specifications page says the A5 is clocked at 1 GHz, though it can adjust its frequency to save battery life. The clock speed of the unit used in the iPhone 4S is 800 MHz. Like the A4, the A5 process size is 45 nm.

An updated 32 nm version of the A5 processor was used in the 3rd-generation Apple TV, the fifth-generation iPod Touch, the iPad Mini, and the new version of iPad 2 (version iPad2,4). The chip in the Apple TV has one core locked. Markings on the square package indicate that it is named APL2498, and in software, the chip is called S5L8942. The 32 nm variant of the A5 provides around 15% better battery life during web browsing, 30% better when playing 3D games and about 20% better battery life during video playback.

In March 2013, Apple released an updated version of the 3rd-generation Apple TV (Rev A, model A1469) containing a smaller, single-core version of the A5 processor. Unlike the other A5 variants, this version of the A5 is not a PoP, having no stacked RAM. The chip is very small, just 6.1×6.2 mm, but as the decrease in size is not due to a decrease in feature size (it is still on a 32 nm fabrication process), this indicates that this A5 revision is of a new design. Markings tell that it is named APL7498, and in software, the chip is called S5L8947.

Apple A5X 

The Apple A5X is an SoC announced on March 7, 2012, at the launch of the third-generation iPad. It is a high-performance variant of the Apple A5; Apple claims it has twice the graphics performance of the A5. It was superseded in the fourth-generation iPad by the Apple A6X processor.

The A5X has a quad-core graphics unit (PowerVR SGX543MP4) instead of the previous dual-core as well as a quad-channel memory controller that provides a memory bandwidth of 12.8 GB/s, roughly three times more than in the A5. The added graphics cores and extra memory channels add up to a very large die size of 165 mm², for example twice the size of Nvidia Tegra 3. This is mainly due to the large PowerVR SGX543MP4 GPU. The clock frequency of the dual ARM Cortex-A9 cores have been shown to operate at the same 1 GHz frequency as in A5. The RAM in A5X is separate from the main CPU package.

Apple A6 

The Apple A6 is a PoP SoC introduced on September 12, 2012, at the launch of the iPhone 5, then a year later was inherited by its minor successor the iPhone 5C. Apple states that it is up to twice as fast and has up to twice the graphics power compared to its predecessor the Apple A5. It is 22% smaller and draws less power than the 45 nm A5.

The A6 is said to use a 1.3 GHz custom Apple-designed ARMv7 based dual-core CPU, called Swift, rather than a licensed CPU from ARM like in previous designs, and an integrated 266 MHz triple-core PowerVR SGX 543MP3 graphics processing unit (GPU). The Swift core in the A6 uses a new tweaked instruction set, ARMv7s, featuring some elements of the ARM Cortex-A15 such as support for the Advanced SIMD v2, and VFPv4. The A6 is manufactured by Samsung on a high-κ metal gate (HKMG) 32 nm process.

Apple A6X 

Apple A6X is an SoC introduced at the launch of the fourth-generation iPad on October 23, 2012. It is a high-performance variant of the Apple A6. Apple claims the A6X has twice the CPU performance and up to twice the graphics performance of its predecessor, the Apple A5X.

Like the A6, this SoC continues to use the dual-core Swift CPU, but it has a new quad core GPU, quad channel memory and slightly higher 1.4 GHz CPU clock rate. It uses an integrated quad-core PowerVR SGX 554MP4 graphics processing unit (GPU) running at 300 MHz and a quad-channel memory subsystem. Compared to the A6 the A6X is 30% larger, but it continues to be manufactured by Samsung on a high-κ metal gate (HKMG) 32 nm process.

Apple A7 

The Apple A7 is a 64-bit PoP SoC whose first appearance was in the iPhone 5S, which was introduced on September 10, 2013. The chip would also be used in the iPad Air, iPad Mini 2 and iPad Mini 3. Apple states that it is up to twice as fast and has up to twice the graphics power compared to its predecessor the Apple A6. The Apple A7 chip is the first 64-bit chip to be used in a smartphone and later a tablet computer.

The A7 features an Apple-designed 1.3–1.4 GHz 64-bit ARMv8-A dual-core CPU, called Cyclone, and an integrated PowerVR G6430 GPU in a four cluster configuration. The ARMv8-A architecture doubles the number of registers of the A7 compared to the A6. It now has 31 general-purpose registers that are each 64-bits wide and 32 floating-point/NEON registers that are each 128-bits wide. The A7 is manufactured by Samsung on a high-κ metal gate (HKMG) 28 nm process and the chip includes over 1 billion transistors on a die 102 mm2 in size.

Apple A8 

The Apple A8 is a 64-bit PoP SoC manufactured by TSMC. Its first appearance was in the iPhone 6 and iPhone 6 Plus, which were introduced on September 9, 2014. A year later it would drive the iPad Mini 4. Apple states that it has 25% more CPU performance and 50% more graphics performance while drawing only 50% of the power compared to its predecessor, the Apple A7. On February 9, 2018, Apple released the HomePod, which is powered by an Apple A8 with 1 GB of RAM.

The A8 features an Apple-designed 1.4 GHz 64-bit ARMv8-A dual-core CPU, and an integrated custom PowerVR GX6450 GPU in a four cluster configuration. The GPU features custom shader cores and compiler. The A8 is manufactured on a 20 nm process by TSMC, which replaced Samsung as the manufacturer of Apple's mobile device processors. It contains 2 billion transistors. Despite that being double the number of transistors compared to the A7, its physical size has been reduced by 13% to 89 mm2 (consistent with a shrink only, not known to be a new microarchitecture).

Apple A8X 

The Apple A8X is a 64-bit SoC introduced at the launch of the iPad Air 2 on October 16, 2014. It is a high performance variant of the Apple A8. Apple states that it has 40% more CPU performance and 2.5 times the graphics performance of its predecessor, the Apple A7.

Unlike the A8, this SoC uses a triple-core CPU, a new octa-core GPU, dual channel memory and slightly higher 1.5 GHz CPU clock rate. It uses an integrated custom octa-core PowerVR GXA6850 graphics processing unit (GPU) running at 450 MHz and a dual-channel memory subsystem. It is manufactured by TSMC on their 20 nm fabrication process, and consists of 3 billion transistors.

Apple A9 

The Apple A9 is a 64-bit ARM-based SoC that first appeared in the iPhone 6S and 6S Plus, which were introduced on September 9, 2015. Apple states that it has 70% more CPU performance and 90% more graphics performance compared to its predecessor, the Apple A8. It is dual sourced, a first for an Apple SoC; it is manufactured by Samsung on their 14 nm FinFET LPE process and by TSMC on their 16 nm FinFET process. It was subsequently included in the first-generation iPhone SE, and the iPad (5th generation). The Apple A9 was the last CPU that Apple manufactured through a contract with Samsung, as all A-series chips after are manufactured by TSMC.

Apple A9X 

The Apple A9X is a 64-bit SoC that was announced on September 9, 2015, and released on November 11, 2015, and first appeared in the iPad Pro. It offers 80% more CPU performance and two times the GPU performance of its predecessor, the Apple A8X. It is manufactured by TSMC using a 16 nm FinFET process.

Apple A10 Fusion 

The Apple A10 Fusion is a 64-bit ARM-based SoC that first appeared in the iPhone 7 and 7 Plus, which were introduced on September 7, 2016. The A10 is also featured in the sixth-generation iPad, seventh-generation iPad and seventh-generation iPod Touch. It has a new ARM big.LITTLE quad core design with two high performance cores, and two smaller highly efficient cores. It is 40% faster than the A9, with 50% faster graphics. It is manufactured by TSMC on their 16 nm FinFET process.

Apple A10X Fusion 

The Apple A10X Fusion is a 64-bit ARM-based SoC that first appeared in the 10.5" iPad Pro and the second generation of the 12.9" iPad Pro, which were both announced on June 5, 2017. It is a variant of the A10 and Apple claims that it has 30 percent faster CPU performance and 40 percent faster GPU performance than its predecessor, the A9X. On September 12, 2017, Apple announced that the Apple TV 4K would be powered by an A10X chip. It is made by TSMC on their 10 nm FinFET process.

Apple A11 Bionic 

The Apple A11 Bionic is a 64-bit ARM-based SoC that first appeared in the iPhone 8, iPhone 8 Plus, and iPhone X, which were introduced on September 12, 2017. It has two high-performance cores, which are 25% faster than the A10 Fusion, four high-efficiency cores, which are 70% faster than the energy-efficient cores in the A10, and for the first time an Apple-designed three-core GPU with 30% faster graphics performance than the A10. It is also the first A-series chip to feature Apple's "Neural Engine," which enhances artificial intelligence and machine learning processes.

Apple A12 Bionic 

The Apple A12 Bionic is a 64-bit ARM-based SoC that first appeared in the iPhone XS, XS Max and XR, which were introduced on September 12, 2018. It is also used in the third-generation iPad Air, fifth-generation iPad Mini, and the eighth-generation iPad. It has two high-performance cores, which are 15% faster than the A11 Bionic, and four high-efficiency cores, which have 50% lower power usage than the energy-efficient cores in the A11 Bionic. The A12 is manufactured by TSMC using a 7 nm FinFET process, the first to ship in a smartphone. It is also used in the 6th generation Apple TV.

Apple A12X Bionic 

The Apple A12X Bionic is a 64-bit ARM-based SoC that first appeared in the 11.0" iPad Pro and the third generation of the 12.9" iPad Pro, which were both announced on October 30, 2018. It offers 35% faster single-core and 90% faster multi-core CPU performance than its predecessor, the A10X. It has four high-performance cores and four high-efficiency cores. The A12X is manufactured by TSMC using a 7 nm FinFET process.

Apple A12Z Bionic 
The Apple A12Z Bionic is an updated version of the A12X Bionic, first appearing in the fourth generation iPad Pro, which was announced on March 18, 2020. It adds an additional GPU core, compared to the A12X, for improved graphics performance. The A12Z is also used in the Developer Transition Kit prototype computer that helps developers prepare their software for Macs based on Apple silicon.

Apple A13 Bionic 

The Apple A13 Bionic is a 64-bit ARM-based SoC that first appeared in the iPhone 11, 11 Pro, and 11 Pro Max, which were introduced on September 10, 2019. It is also featured in the second-generation iPhone SE (released April 15, 2020), the 9th generation iPad (announced September 14, 2021) and in the Studio Display (announced March 8, 2022)

The entire A13 SoC features a total of 18 cores – a six-core CPU, four-core GPU, and an eight-core Neural Engine processor, which is dedicated to handling on-board machine learning processes; four of the six cores on the CPU are low-powered cores that are dedicated to handling less CPU-intensive operations, such as voice calls, browsing the Web, and sending messages, while two higher-performance cores are used only for more CPU-intensive processes, such as recording 4K video or playing a video game.

Apple A14 Bionic 

The Apple A14 Bionic is a 64-bit ARM-based SoC that first appeared in the fourth-generation iPad Air and iPhone 12, released on October 23, 2020. It is the first commercially available 5 nm chipset and it contains 11.8 billion transistors and a 16-core AI processor. It includes Samsung LPDDR4X DRAM, a 6-core CPU, and 4-Core GPU with real time machine learning capabilities.  It was later used in the  tenth-generation iPad, released on October 26, 2022.

Apple A15 Bionic 

The Apple A15 Bionic is a 64-bit ARM-based SoC that first appeared in the iPhone 13, unveiled on September 14, 2021. The A15 is built on a 5-nanometer manufacturing process with 15 billion transistors. It has 2 high-performance processing cores, 4 high-efficiency cores, a new 5-core graphics for iPhone 13 Pro series (4-core for iPhone 13 and 13 mini) processing unit, and a new 16-core Neural Engine capable of 15.8 trillion operations per second. It is also used in the iPhone SE (3rd generation), iPhone 14, iPhone 14 Plus and iPad Mini 6.

Apple A16 Bionic 

The Apple A16 Bionic is a 64-bit ARM-based SoC that first appeared in the iPhone 14 Pro, unveiled on September 7, 2022. The A16 has 16 billion transistors and is built on TSMC's N4 fabrication process, being touted by Apple as the first 4 nm processor in a smartphone. However, N4 is an enhanced version of N5 technology, a de facto third-generation 5 nm manufacturing process. The chip has 2 high-performance processing cores, 4 high-efficiency cores and 5-core graphics for iPhone 14 Pro series. Memory is upgraded to LPDDR5 for 50% higher bandwidth and a 7% faster 16-core Neural Engine capable of 17 trillion operations per second.

List of processors

H series 
The Apple "H" series is a family of SoCs with low-power audio processing and wireless connectivity for use in headphones.

Apple H1 

The Apple H1 chip was first used in the 2019 version of AirPods, and was later used in the Powerbeats Pro, the Beats Solo Pro, Beat Fit Pro, the AirPods Pro, the 2020 Powerbeats, AirPods Max, and the AirPods (3rd generation). Specifically designed for headphones, it has Bluetooth 5.0, supports hands-free "Hey Siri" commands, and offers 30 percent lower latency than the W1 chip used in earlier AirPods.

Apple H2 

The Apple H2 chip was first used in the 2022 version of AirPods Pro. It has Bluetooth 5.3, and implements 48 kHz noise reduction in hardware.

List of processors

M series 
The Apple "M" series is a family of systems on a chip (SoC) used in Mac computers from November 2020 or later, iPad Pro tablets from April 2021 or later, and iPad Air tablets from March 2022 or later. The "M" designation was previously used for Apple motion coprocessors.

Apple M1 

The M1, Apple's first system on a chip designed for use in Macs, is manufactured using TSMC's 5 nm process. Announced on November 10, 2020, it is used in the MacBook Air (M1, 2020), Mac mini (M1, 2020), MacBook Pro (13-inch, M1, 2020), iMac (24-inch, M1, 2021), iPad Pro (5th generation) and iPad Air (5th generation). It comes with 4 performance cores and 4 efficiency cores, for a total of 8 CPU cores. It comes with up to 8 GPU cores, with the entry level MacBook Air having only 7 GPU cores. The M1 has 16 billion transistors.

Apple M1 Pro 
The M1 Pro is a more powerful version of the M1, with six to eight performance cores, two efficiency cores, 14 to 16 GPU cores, 16 Neural Engine cores, up to 32 GB unified RAM with up to 200 GB/s memory bandwidth, and more than double the transistors. It was announced on October 18, 2021, and is used in the 14- and 16-inch MacBook Pro. Apple said the CPU performance is about 70% faster than the M1, and that its GPU performance is about double. Apple claims the M1 Pro can deliver up to 20 streams of 4K or 7 streams of 8K ProRes video playback (up from 6 offered by Afterburner card for 2019 Mac Pro).

Apple M1 Max 
The M1 Max is a larger version of the M1 Pro chip, with eight performance cores, two efficiency cores, 24 to 32 GPU cores, 16 Neural Engine cores, up to 64 GB unified RAM with up to 400 GB/s memory bandwidth, and more than double the number of transistors.  It was announced on October 18, 2021, and is used in the 14- and 16-inch MacBook Pro, as well as the Mac Studio. Apple says it has 57 billion transistors. Apple claims the M1 Max can deliver up to 30 streams of 4K (up from 23 offered by Afterburner card for 2019 Mac Pro) or 7 streams of 8K ProRes video playback.

Apple M1 Ultra 
The M1 Ultra consists of two M1 Max dies connected together by a silicon interposer through Apple's UltraFusion technology. It has 114 billion transistors, 16 performance cores, 4 efficiency cores, 48 to 64 GPU cores and 32 Neural Engine cores; it can be configured with up to 128 GB unified RAM of 800 GB/s memory bandwidth. It was announced on March 8, 2022, as an optional upgrade for the Mac Studio. Apple claims the M1 Ultra can deliver up to 18 streams of 8K ProRes video playback.

Apple M2 

Apple announced the M2 SoC on June 6, 2022, at WWDC, along with the new MacBook Air and the new 13-inch MacBook Pro and later the iPad Pro (6th generation). It is the successor to the Apple M1. The M2 is made with TSMC's "Enhanced 5-nanometer technology" N5P process and contains 20 billion transistors, a 25% increase from the previous generation M1. The M2 can be configured with up to 24 gigabytes of RAM and 2 terabytes of storage. It has 8 CPU cores (4 performance and 4 efficiency) and up to 10 GPU cores. Apple claims CPU improvements up to 18% and GPU improvements up to 35% compared to the previous M1.

Apple M2 Pro 

The M2 Pro is a more powerful version of the M2, with six to eight performance cores, four efficiency cores, 16 to 19 core GPU, 16 Apple Next Generation Neural Engine cores, up to 32 GBs of unified RAM with up to 200 GB/s memory bandwidth, and over 40 billion transistors, 20 percent more than the M1 Pro and twice the M2. It was announced on January 17, 2023 in a press release and it is used in the 14 and 16 inch 2023 MacBook Pro (Apple silicon) as well as the Mac Mini. Apple claims the CPU performance on the M2 Pro is 20 percent faster than the M1 Pro and the GPU is 30 percent faster than the one on the M1 Pro.

Apple M2 Max 

The M2 Max is a larger more powerful version of the M2 Pro, with eight performance cores, four efficiency cores, 30 to 38 core GPU, 16 Apple Next Generation Neural Engine cores, up to 96GBs of unified RAM with up to 400 GB/s memory bandwidth, and over 67 billion transistors, 10 billion more than the M1 Max and 3x the M2. It was announced on January 17, 2023 in a press release and it is used in the 14 and 16 inch 2023 MacBook Pro (Apple silicon). Apple claims the CPU performance on the M2 Max is 20 percent faster that M1 Max and the GPU is 30 percent faster than the M1 Max. According to Apple, "the M2 Max is the most powerful and efficient chip in a pro laptop".

List of processors

S series 

The Apple "S" series is a family of systems in a package (SiP) used in the Apple Watch and HomePod. It uses a customized application processor that together with memory, storage and support processors for wireless connectivity, sensors, and I/O form a complete computer in a single package. They are designed by Apple and manufactured by contract manufacturers such as Samsung.

Apple S1 

The Apple S1 is an integrated computer. It includes memory, storage and support circuits like wireless modems and I/O controllers in a sealed integrated package. It was announced on September 9, 2014, as part of the "Wish we could say more" event. It was used in the first-generation Apple Watch.

Apple S1P 
Used in Apple Watch Series 1. It has a dual-core processor identical to the S2, with the exception of the built-in GPS receiver.  It contains the same dual-core CPU with the same new GPU capabilities as the S2, making it about 50% faster than the S1.

Apple S2 

Used in the Apple Watch Series 2. It has a dual-core processor and a built-in GPS receiver. The S2's two cores deliver 50% higher performance and the GPU delivers twice as much as the predecessor, and is similar in performance to the Apple S1P.

Apple S3 
Used in the Apple Watch Series 3. It has a dual-core processor that is 70% faster than the Apple S2 and a built-in GPS receiver. There is also an option for a cellular modem and an internal eSIM module. It also includes the W2 chip. The S3 also contains a barometric altimeter, the W2 wireless connectivity processor, and in some models UMTS (3G) and LTE (4G) cellular modems served by a built-in eSIM.

Apple S4 
Used in the Apple Watch Series 4. It has a custom 64-bit dual-core processor based on the A12 with up to 2× faster performance. It also contains the W3 wireless chip, which supports Bluetooth 5. The S4 introduced 64-bit ARMv8 cores to the Apple Watch. The chip contains two Tempest cores, which are the energy-efficient cores found in the A12. Despite the small size, Tempest still uses a 3-wide decode out-of-order superscalar design, which make them much more powerful than previous in-order cores.

The S4 contains a Neural Engine that is able to run Core ML. Third-party apps can use it starting from watchOS 6. The SiP also includes new accelerometer and gyroscope functionality that has twice the dynamic range in measurable values of its predecessor, as well as being able to sample data at 8 times the speed. It also contains a new custom GPU, which can use the Metal API.

Apple S5 
Used in the Apple Watch Series 5, Watch SE, and HomePod mini. It adds a built-in magnetometer to the custom 64-bit dual-core processor and GPU of the S4.

Apple S6 
Used in the Apple Watch Series 6. It has a custom 64-bit dual-core processor that runs up to 20 percent faster than the S5. The dual cores in the S6 are based on the A13's energy-efficient "little" Thunder cores at 1.8 GHz. Like the S4 and S5, it also contains the W3 wireless chip. The S6 adds the new U1 ultra wideband chip, an always-on altimeter, and 5 GHz WiFi.

Apple S7 
Used in the Apple Watch Series 7 and second-generation HomePod. The S7 has the same T8301 identifier and quoted performance as the S6.

Apple S8 
Used in the Apple Watch SE (2nd generation), Watch Series 8, and Watch Ultra. The S8 adds a new three-axis gyroscope and high g-force accelerometer. It has the same T8301 identifier and quoted performance as the S6 and S7.

List of processors

T series 
The T series chip operates as a secure enclave on Intel-based MacBook and iMac computers released from 2016 onwards. The chip processes and encrypts biometric information (Touch ID) and acts as a gatekeeper to the microphone and FaceTime HD camera, protecting them from hacking. The chip runs bridgeOS, a purported variant of watchOS. The functions of the T series processor were built into the M series CPUs, thus ending the need for the T series.

Apple T1 
The Apple T1 chip is an ARMv7 SoC (derived from the processor in the Apple Watch's S2) that drives the System Management Controller (SMC) and Touch ID sensor of the 2016 and 2017 MacBook Pro with Touch Bar.

Apple T2 

The Apple T2 security chip is a SoC first released in the iMac Pro. It is a 64-bit ARMv8 chip (a variant of the A10 Fusion, or T8010), and runs bridgeOS. It provides a secure enclave for encrypted keys, enables users to lock down the computer's boot process, handles system functions like the camera and audio control, and handles on-the-fly encryption and decryption for the solid-state drive. T2 also delivers "enhanced imaging processing" for the iMac Pro's FaceTime HD camera.

List of processors

U series 
The Apple "U" series is a family of systems in a package (SiP) implementing ultra-wideband (UWB) radio.

Apple U1 

The Apple U1 is used in the iPhone 11 series and later (excluding the second and third generation iPhone SE), Apple Watch Series 6 and newer, HomePod Mini, AirTag trackers and the charging case for AirPods Pro (2nd generation).

List of processors

W series 
The Apple "W" series is a family of RF SoCs used for Bluetooth and Wi-Fi connectivity.

Apple W1 
The Apple W1 is a SoC used in the 2016 AirPods and select Beats headphones. It maintains a Bluetooth Class 1 connection with a computer device and decodes the audio stream that is sent to it.

Apple W2 
The Apple W2, used in the Apple Watch Series 3, is integrated into the Apple S3 SiP. Apple said the chip makes Wi-Fi 85% faster and allows Bluetooth and Wi-Fi to use half the power of the W1 implementation.

Apple W3 
The Apple W3 is used in the Apple Watch Series 4, Series 5, Series 6, SE (1st generation), Series 7, Series 8, SE (2nd generation), and Ultra. It is integrated into the Apple S4, S5, S6, S7 and S8 SiPs. It supports Bluetooth 5.0/5.3.

List of processors

M-series coprocessors 

The Apple M-series coprocessors are motion coprocessors used by Apple Inc. in their mobile devices. First released in 2013, their function is to collect sensor data from integrated accelerometers, gyroscopes and compasses and offload the collecting and processing of sensor data from the main central processing unit (CPU).

Only the M7 and M8 coprocessors were housed on separate chips; the M9, M10, and M11 coprocessors were embedded in their corresponding A-series chips. Beginning with the A12 Bionic chip in 2018, the motion coprocessors were fully integrated into the SoC; this allowed Apple to reuse the "M"-series codename for their desktop SoCs.

List of coprocessors

Miscellaneous devices 
This segment is about Apple-designed processors that are not easily sorted into another section.

Early series 

Apple first used SoCs in early versions of the iPhone and iPod Touch. They combine in one package a single ARM-based processing core (CPU), a graphics processing unit (GPU), and other electronics necessary for mobile computing.

The APL0098 (also 8900B or S5L8900) is a package on package (PoP) system on a chip (SoC) that was introduced on June 29, 2007, at the launch of the original iPhone. It includes a 412 MHz single-core ARM11 CPU and a PowerVR MBX Lite GPU. It was manufactured by Samsung on a 90 nm process. The iPhone 3G and the first-generation iPod Touch also use it.

The APL0278 (also S5L8720) is a PoP SoC introduced on September 9, 2008, at the launch of the second-generation iPod Touch. It includes a 533 MHz single-core ARM11 CPU and a PowerVR MBX Lite GPU. It was manufactured by Samsung on a 65 nm process.

The APL0298 (also S5L8920) is a PoP SoC introduced on June 8, 2009, at the launch of the iPhone 3GS. It includes a 600 MHz single-core Cortex-A8 CPU and a PowerVR SGX535 GPU. It was manufactured by Samsung on a 65 nm process.

The APL2298 (also S5L8922) is a 45 nm die shrunk version of the iPhone 3GS SoC and was introduced on September 9, 2009, at the launch of the third-generation iPod Touch.

Other 
The Samsung S5L8747 is an ARM-based microcontroller used in Apple's Lightning Digital AV Adapter, a Lightning-to-HDMI adapter. This is a miniature computer with 256 MB RAM, running an XNU kernel loaded from the connected iOS device, then taking a serial signal from the iOS device translating that into a proper HDMI signal.

See also 
 ARM Cortex-A9
 List of iOS, iPadOS, tvOS, and watchOS devices
 List of Mac models grouped by CPU type
 List of Samsung platforms (SoCs):
 Exynos (none have been used by Apple)
 historical (some were used in Apple products)
 PowerVR SGX GPUs were also used in the iPhone 3GS and the third-generation iPod Touch
 PWRficient, a processor designed by P.A. Semi, a company Apple acquired to form an in-house custom chip design department

Similar platforms 
 A31 by AllWinner
 Atom by Intel
 BCM2xxxx by Broadcom
 eMAG and Altra by Ampere Computing
 Exynos by Samsung
 i.MX by Freescale Semiconductor
 Jaguar and Puma by AMD
 Kirin by HiSilicon
 MTxxxx by MediaTek
 NovaThor by ST-Ericsson
 OMAP by Texas Instruments
 RK3xxx by Rockchip
 Snapdragon by Qualcomm
 Tegra by Nvidia

Notes

References

Further reading 
 

 
Computer-related introductions in 2011
System on a chip
32-bit microprocessors
64-bit microprocessors